Durnell is an unincorporated community in Stoddard County, in the U.S. state of Missouri.

History
A post office called Durnell was established in 1906, and remained in operation until 1926. The community has the name of one Mr. Durnell, a businessperson in the local lumber industry.

References

Unincorporated communities in Stoddard County, Missouri
Unincorporated communities in Missouri
1906 establishments in Missouri